The Klemm Kl 36 is a 1930s German four-seat cabin touring and competition monoplane. It was designed by Klemm and Friedrich Fechner and built by Klemm.

History

Development
Following the success of the 3-seat touring plane Klemm Kl 32 in the European touring plane championship Challenge 1932, the company was ordered by the German Reichs luftfahrt ministerium (RLM) to develop another aircraft to take part in Challenge 1934. Due to changes in contest rules, it had to be a more modern machine, a 4-seater, featuring better performance and better STOL capabilities. As a result, the Kl 36 was a streamlined, comfortable four-seat plane with wing mechanization. It was the fastest of all Klemm's builds.

Four aircraft were built of the Kl 36A series (two powered by  Argus As 17inverted 6-cylinder in-line engines, and two by  Hirth HM8U inverted V8 engines - D-IHEK, D-IHAV. Both engines were air-cooled).

Later, 8 0-series aircraft were built, designated Kl 36B. They were powered with different engines, including  Siemens-Halske Sh 14 A-1 radial engines. One was completed with retractable landing gear (D-IUHU). Because there was no weight limit, they were somewhat heavier than the Kl 36A.

Operational history
Four Kl 36As took part in the Challenge 1934 touring plane championship in August–September, but none completed a rally over Europe. Fritz Morzik, who won two challenges, had to withdraw due to a fuel pump breakdown, but flew the rally track off the contest. During the technical part, they obtained good results in a minimal speed trial (57.67  km/h), but  proved generally inferior to the Fieseler Fi 97.

During World War II, Klemm Kl 36s served as a liaison aircraft in the Luftwaffe.

Technical description
The Klemm Kl 36 is a mixed-construction, low-wing, cantilever monoplane. It contains a conventional tail unit, a three-part wing structure, and a steel frame fuselage with a canvas covering. Surfaces on the outer parts of the wings and tail are covered in plywood. The wings are fitted with slats and flaps, which fold rearwards. The plane has a fixed tail skid landing gear. The landing wheels were often fit with teardrop covers. The median load of the plane was 490 kg, and the fuel tank had a capacity of 230L. The plane used a two-blade propeller, powered by a front-mounted engine. 

The Kl 36 could fit 3 people, including the pilot.

Specifications

See also

References

Sources
 Marian Krzyżan: "Międzynarodowe turnieje lotnicze 1929–1934", WKiŁ, Warsaw 1988,  (Polish language)

1930s German civil utility aircraft
1930s German military utility aircraft
1930s German sport aircraft
Klemm aircraft
Low-wing aircraft
Aircraft first flown in 1934
Single-engined tractor aircraft